The 1968 International Cross Country Championships was held in Tunis, Tunisia, at the Hippodrome de Kassar-Said on March 17, 1968. The women's championship was held one week later in Blackburn, England at the Witton Country Park on March 23, 1968.  A report on the men's event as well as on the women's event was given in the Glasgow Herald.

Complete results for men, junior men,  women, medallists, 
 and the results of British athletes were published.

Medallists

Individual Race Results

Men's (7.5 mi / 12.1 km)

Junior Men's (4.35 mi / 7.0 km)

Women's (2.8 mi / 4.5 km)

Team Results

Men's

Junior Men's

Women's

Participation
An unofficial count yields the participation of 177 athletes from 14 countries.

 (12)
 (13)
 (20)
 (9)
 (14)
 (3)
 (12)
 (8)
 (20)
 (14)
 (7)
 (14)
 (13)
 (18)

See also
 1968 in athletics (track and field)

References

International Cross Country Championships
International Cross Country Championships
Cross
International Cross Country Championships
Sport in Tunis
20th century in Tunis
Cross country running in Tunisia